White City was an amusement park located at Lake Whatcom's Silver Beach in Bellingham, Washington.

White City opened in 1906 and closed in 1919. The park had a wooden roller coaster, plus a hotel, dance hall and an ice cream parlor. White City was named because of its "white" electric lights.

References

External links

Defunct amusement parks in the United States
Amusement parks in Washington (state)
1906 establishments in Washington (state)
1919 disestablishments in the United States